Duane Charles Josephson (June 3, 1942 – January 30, 1997) was an American catcher who played in Major League Baseball for the Chicago White Sox and Boston Red Sox in parts of eight seasons spanning 1965–1972. Listed at 6' 0", 190 lb., he batted and threw right-handed.

Josephson was born in New Hampton, Iowa, where he attended New Hampton High School.  Josephson then attended University of Northern Iowa.

His most productive season came in 1968, when he posted career-highs in hits (107), doubles (16), triples (six), RBI (45),  games (128), and was selected to the All-Star Game.

In an eight-season career, Josephson posted a .258 batting average with 23 home runs and 164 RBI in 470 games played.

In between, Josephson appeared in four Minor League seasons from 1964–1967, and also played winter ball with the Navegantes del Magallanes club of the Venezuelan League during the 1966-67 tournament.

Additionally, he earned the Pacific Coast League MVP Award in 1966, after hitting a slash line of .324/.369/.446 with 237 total bases and 77 RBI in 146 games for the Indianapolis Indians.

Josephson was forced to retire from baseball at the age of 30 due to pericarditis. He died in 1997 in his hometown of New Hampton, Iowa, at the age of 54.

References

External links
, or Retrosheet, or Baseball Almanac, or Baseball Library, or SABR Biography Project, or Pura Pelota (Venezuelan Winter League)

1942 births
1997 deaths
American League All-Stars
Baseball players from Iowa
Boston Red Sox players
Chicago White Sox players
Clinton C-Sox players
Florida Instructional League White Sox players
Indianapolis Indians players
Lynchburg White Sox players
Major League Baseball catchers
Navegantes del Magallanes players
American expatriate baseball players in Venezuela
Northern Iowa Panthers baseball players
Northern Iowa Panthers football players
Northern Iowa Panthers men's basketball players
Pacific Coast League MVP award winners
People from New Hampton, Iowa